Alpha-catulin is a protein that in humans is encoded by the CTNNAL1 gene.

Interactions 
CTNNAL1 has been shown to interact with AKAP13.

References

External links

Further reading